Madytos is a former municipality in the Thessaloniki regional unit, Greece. Since the 2011 local government reform it is part of the municipality Volvi, of which it is a municipal unit. Its population was 2,460 in 2011. The municipal unit has an area of 89.909 km2. The seat of the municipality was in Nea Madytos. The town takes its name from the ancient Greek city of Madytus at the shore of Hellespont.

References

Populated places in Thessaloniki (regional unit)